USS Margo (SP-870) was a raised deck cruiser built for private use taken into the United States Navy as a Section patrol vessel in commission from 1917 to 1918 and returned to the owner after the war.

Private cruiser
Margo was designed by John Trumpy and built as a raised deck cruiser with one funnel and tow masts in 1913 by the Mathis Yacht Building Company at Camden, New Jersey for George H. McNeely of Philadelphia. The motorboat was Mathis' hull number 33 and assigned the official number 211427 and signal letters LCDF on registration.

The cruiser's raised deck covered the crew quarters, designed for four, and extended as a trunk cabin over the engine room. The saloon was reached by stairway from the main deck. That space was 16 feet (4.9 m) in length with a long sofa with lockers flanked by buffets along the port side and Pullman berths on the starboard side. A mantle over a hot water radiator was at the forward end of the saloon with a door on the port side leading to a toilet and the one to starboard to a galley. The two berth owner's stateroom, furnished with easy chairs and rockers, was aft of the saloon. Owner's areas were finished in ivory white with mahogany trim.

One electrical generating set driven by belt from the main engine provided a quarter kilowatt of power.

World War I
On 14 June 1917, the U.S. Navy acquired her under a free lease from her owner, George H. McNeely of Philadelphia, Pennsylvania, for use as a Section patrol boat during World War I. She was commissioned the same day as USS Margo (SP-870).

Margo was ssigned to the 4th Naval District and based at Philadelphia carrying out patrol duties in the Delaware River area for the rest of World War I and was returned to McNelly on 4 December 1918.

Post war
The cruiser was sold, renamed Pandora III and was owned by several people in the New York area until scrapped in 1955.

References

External links
"Margo a 64 Footer"; Motor Boating, October 1913 with exterior and interior photographs.
NavSource Online: Section Patrol Craft Photo Archive Margo (SP 870)

Patrol vessels of the United States Navy
World War I patrol vessels of the United States
Ships built by the Mathis Yacht Building Company
1913 ships